John Hubert Stevens (March 7, 1890 – November 26, 1950) was an American bobsledder who competed in the 1930s. Competing in two Winter Olympics, he won the gold medal in the two-man event at Lake Placid in 1932.

Lake Stevens in the Adirondack Mountains in New York is named in his honor. He was the brother of fellow bobsledders Curtis Stevens and Paul Stevens.

References

External links
Bobsleigh two-man Olympic medalists 1932–56 and since 1964
DatabaseOlympics.com profile
Wallechinsky, David and Jaime Loucky (2010). "Bobsleigh: Two-Man". In The Complete Book of the Winter Olympics: 2010 Edition. London: Aurum Press Limited. p. 157.

1890 births
1950 deaths
American male bobsledders
Bobsledders at the 1932 Winter Olympics
Bobsledders at the 1936 Winter Olympics
Olympic gold medalists for the United States in bobsleigh
Medalists at the 1932 Winter Olympics